Wolford Chapel in Devon,  England, is the burial place of John Graves Simcoe, the first lieutenant governor of Upper Canada. It is the territory of the Canadian province of Ontario, and flies the Flag of Canada despite being in the English countryside.

The chapel was part of the Simcoe Estate at Dunkeswell, near Honiton, Devon, in South West England and was built on John Graves Simcoe's commission in 1802. The Simcoes had purchased an estate at Wolford and built Wolford Lodge. Following Simcoe's death on 26 October 1806 the estate remained with the family until 1923 but was eventually sold and some parts broken up. 

The Chapel, alongside most of the estate, was acquired by British publisher Sir Geoffrey Harmsworth. Consideration of what to do with the chapel remained, and various ideas were put forward including transporting it to Canada. However, in 1966, Harmsworth decided to donate the chapel to the John Graves Simcoe Memorial Foundation on behalf of the people of Ontario. On 27 September 1966, just under 160 years after Simcoe's death, Harmsworth gave a deed to then-Premier of Ontario John Robarts, alongside a deed making a permanent right of way to access the property, presented by  A. G. LeMarchant. In 1982 the Ontario Heritage Trust acquired the property.

The chapel is a Grade II listed building. It is a small building, rectangular in plan, built of local stone rubble with limestone ashlar details and a slate roof.

Simcoe's wife, Elizabeth Simcoe and some of their children are also buried at the site, which is maintained by local people on behalf of the John Graves Simcoe Memorial Foundation.

References

External links

Ontario Heritage Trust

Grade II listed churches in Devon
Ontario Heritage Trust